Nanichher is a coastal village in Gujarat, India.

References

Villages in Kutch district